Nthomeng Justina Majara (born 8 June 1963) is the former chief justice of Lesotho, from September 2014 to 11 September 2018, and the first woman to hold this office. Former Chief Justice Nthomeng Majara has been appointed as Deputy Prime Minister and Minister of Justice, Law and Parliamentary Affairs. She is the first woman to be appointed as Deputy Prime Minister and was also the first woman to be appointed Chief Justice in Lesotho.

Early life
Nthomeng Justina Majara was born on 8 June 1963 in Lesotho, and her mother tongue is Sesotho. She earned a bachelor's degree in law from the National University of Lesotho, graduating in 1992, and a master's degree in law from King's College London, graduating in 1997.

Career
Majara was appointed as the chief justice of Lesotho in September 2014, when she took over from Justice Tšeliso Monaphathi, who has been the acting chief justice since April 2013. When the High Court and Court of Appeal Registrar, Lesitsi Mokeke, was asked for more details, he replied, "This is news to me because I have just come out of a meeting with Justice Monaphathi ... I think he is also not aware of this development."

As of June 2017, Majara is one 12 nominees for an election of six judges to the International Criminal Court to represent the African States regional group.

Personal life
In October 2017, Majara was living in a "lavish Maseru mansion" sub-let from High Court judge Teboho Moiloa, despite government internal auditors having condemned the arrangement six months earlier.

See also 
 First women lawyers around the world

References 

5. 

1963 births
Living people
National University of Lesotho alumni
Alumni of King's College London
Lesotho women in politics
Lesotho women lawyers
Women chief justices
People from Maseru
Lesotho judges 
https://www.thepost.co.ls/comment/insight-pst/big-steps-for-women/